Tomentgaurotes is a genus of beetles in the family Cerambycidae, containing the following species:

 Tomentgaurotes batesi (Aurivillius, 1912)
 Tomentgaurotes maculosus (Bates, 1885)
 Tomentgaurotes multiguttatus (Bates, 1892)
 Tomentgaurotes ochropus (Bates, 1880)
 Tomentgaurotes plumbeus Chemsak & Linsley, 1963

References

Lepturinae